The 2018 Tour of Britain was an eight-stage men's professional road cycling race. It was the fifteenth running of the modern version of the Tour of Britain and the 78th British tour in total. The race started on 2 September in Pembrey Country Park and finished on 9 September in London. It was part of the 2018 UCI Europe Tour.  The French rider Julian Alaphilippe of  won the race.

Teams
 were replaced by  less than week before the start of the race.
The starting teams were:

Stages

Stage 1
2 September 2018 — Pembrey to Newport,

Stage 2
3 September 2018 — Cranbrook to Barnstaple,

Stage 3
4 September 2018 — Bristol to Bristol,

Stage 4
5 September 2018 — Nuneaton to Leamington Spa,

Stage 5
6 September 2018 — Cockermouth to Whinlatter Pass,  (TTT)

Stage 6
7 September 2018 — Barrow-in-Furness to Whinlatter Pass,

Stage 7
8 September 2018 — West Bridgford to Mansfield,

Stage 8
9 September 2018 — London to London,

Classification leadership

References

External links

2018
Tour of Britain
Tour of Britain
Tour of Britain